Mountain View School District is a public school district based in Los Angeles County, California, United States that operates ten elementary schools, two middle schools, and two learning centers.

History 
In 2021, the school district voted to close Cogswell Elementary, Kranz Intermediate, Madrid Middle and Voorhis Elementary schools due to declining enrollment. Several elementary schools were also reconfigured to K-8 schools to replace the middle schools that closed.

Schools

Elementary schools 
 Baker Elementary School 
 La Primaria Elementary School
 Maxson Elementary School
 Miramonte Elementary School
 Payne Elementary School

K-8 schools 
 Monte Vista K-8 School
 Parkview K-8 School
 Twin Lakes K-8 School

References

External links
 

School districts in Los Angeles County, California